Theresa Lazar Springmann (born January 23, 1956) is a senior United States district judge of the United States District Court for the Northern District of Indiana.

Early life and education
Born in Gary, Indiana, as the third of four children and the granddaughter of immigrants from Ireland and Russia. In 1977, Springmann graduated summa cum laude from Indiana University with a Bachelor of Arts degree and later from Notre Dame Law School with a Juris Doctor in 1980.

Legal career
Following law school graduation, she worked as a law clerk for Judge James Tyne Moody of the United States District Court for the Northern District of Indiana from 1980 to 1983. She was in private practice in Indiana from 1984 to 1995. She served as a United States magistrate judge of the Northern District of Indiana from 1995 to 2003.

Federal judicial career
On the recommendation of Senator Richard Lugar, Springmann was nominated to the United States District Court for the Northern District of Indiana by President George W. Bush on January 29, 2003, to a seat vacated by James Tyne Moody.  Springmann was confirmed by the Senate on March 31, 2003, on a Senate vote and received her commission on June 24, 2003. She served as chief judge from February 3, 2017, to May 31, 2020. She assumed senior status on  January 23, 2021, her 65th birthday.

Notable rulings
In May 1997, a John M. Stephenson received a guilty verdict and death sentence for killing three people in Warrick County, Indiana. He appealed his case to the Indiana Supreme Court on the basis of "ineffective counsel" because his attorney didn't object to him wearing a stun belt in front of the jury that convicted him. In April 2007, the Indiana Supreme Court unanimously rejected his appeal.

After the Indiana Supreme Court rejected Stephenson's appeal, he took it to the federal level, where Judge Springmann overturned his guilty sentence and the death penalty in a 26-page ruling. She noted, "Due process mandates that John M. Stephenson is entitled to what he was denied: a trial without restraints".

The Seventh Circuit Court of Appeals reversed and remanded. On remand, Judge Springmann ruled that Stephenson had not been prejudiced by his lawyer's failure to object to his having to wear a stun belt visible to jurors in the penalty phase of the litigation. In 2017, on appeal for the second time, Seventh Circuit Court of Appeals affirmed in part and reversed in part. The appellate court ruled that Stephenson was not entitled to habeas relief with respect to his murder conviction, but that he was entitled to a new sentencing hearing because his attorney was ineffective for failing to object to his having to wear a stun belt.

References

Sources

1956 births
Living people
Indiana University alumni
Notre Dame Law School alumni
Judges of the United States District Court for the Northern District of Indiana
United States district court judges appointed by George W. Bush
21st-century American judges
People from Gary, Indiana
United States magistrate judges
21st-century American women judges